The 1976 Rhodesian Grand Prix was held at Donnybrook Raceway in Salisbury, Rhodesia on the 31 July 1976. It was a non-championship round of the South African Formula Atlantic series. It was won by Roy Klomfass driving a British-built Ralt RT1.

Results

Qualifying 

1. Roy Klomfass (F/Atl), 1.03.6    
2. Tony Martin (F/Atl), 1.04.5    
3. Dave Charlton (F/Atl, 1.04.9    
4. Nols Nieman (F/Atl), 1.04.9    
5. John Gibb (F/Atl), 1.06.3 
No other driver posted a time.

References 
OldRacingCars.com

Motorsport in Rhodesia
Grand Prix
1976 in motorsport
20th century in Harare
Sport in Harare